Red Desert may refer to:

 Red Desert (film), a 1964 Italian film
 Red Desert (Wyoming), a 6 million acre (24,000 km²) high altitude desert in Wyoming
 Red Desert, a small desert near Port Edward, KwaZulu-Natal, South Africa.